

Overview
Malatia were disbanded before the season began, therefore FC Lori were given the chance to stay up.
FC Karabakh Yerevan changed their name to Lernayin Artsakh FC Yerevan.

League table

Results

Top goalscorers

See also
 2002 in Armenian football
 2002 Armenian First League
 2002 Armenian Cup

Armenian Premier League seasons
1
Armenia
Armenia